The 2016–17 FAW Welsh Cup is the 130th season of the annual knockout tournament for competitive football teams in Wales. The defending champions are The New Saints, having defeated Airbus UK Broughton 2–0 in the previous year's competition. The total prize money for 2015–16 was set at £180,000.

First qualifying round 

The First Qualifying Round featured teams outside of the top two tiers of Welsh football league system. The matches in the first qualifying round were played on 19, 20, 21, and 27 August 2016 and was regionalised into North-west, North-east, Central, South-west and South-east.

|-
!colspan="3" align="center"|19 August

|-
!colspan="3" align="center"|20 August

|-
!colspan="3" align="center"|21 August

|-
!colspan="3" align="center"|27 August

|}

Second qualifying round

The matches of the Second Qualifying Round were played on 9 and 10 September 2016. The draw was regionalised into South, North and Central groupings.

|-
!colspan="3" align="center"|9 September

|-
!colspan="3" align="center"|10 September

|}

First round

The First Round matches were played on 29 and 30 September 2016 and 1, 2, 4, and October 2016. This round was regionalised to North and South groups and included teams from the second tier of Welsh football.

|-
!colspan="3" align="center"|29 September

|-
!colspan="3" align="center"|30 September

|-
!colspan="3" align="center"|1 October

|-
!colspan="3" align="center"|2 October

|-
!colspan="3" align="center"|4 October

|-
!colspan="3" align="center"|8 October

|}

Second round

The Second Round matches were played on 4 and 5 November 2016. This round was regionalised into North and South groups.

|-
!colspan="3" align="center"|4 November

|-
!colspan="3" align="center"|5 November

|}

Third round

The Third Round matches were played on 2, 3, and 10 December 2016. This round was not regionalised and a free draw.

|-
!colspan="3" align="center"|2 December

|-
!colspan="3" align="center"|3 December

|-
!colspan="3" align="center"|10 December

|}

Fourth round

The Fourth Round matches were played on 28 January 2017. This round was not regionalised and a free draw.

|-
!colspan="3" align="center"|28 January

|}

Fifth Round

The Fifth Round matches were played on 25 February 2017. This round was not regionalised and a free draw.

|-
!colspan="3" align="center"|25 February

|}

Semi-finals

|-
!colspan="3" align="center"|1 April

|}

Final

|-
!colspan="3" align="center"|30 April

|}

References

Welsh Cup seasons
Wales
Cup